Abdul Latif Siddiqui (born 1943) is a Bangladesh Awami League politician. He represented the Tangail-4 constituency for two terms in the Bangladesh Parliament. He served as the Minister of Textiles and Jute in the second Hasina ministry and Minister of Posts, Telecommunications and Information Technology in the third Hasina ministry.

Abdul Latif Siddiqui is the elder brother of politician Abdul Kader Siddique.

Career
Siddiqui served as a Jatiya Sangsad member from Tangail-4 constituency. He resigned on 1 September 2015. He served as the Jute and Textiles Minister from 2009 to 2013. In January 2014, he was appointed as the Posts and Telecommunications along with Information Communication Technology Minister in the 10th cabinet.

In March 2014, Siddiqui was reported by media to have beaten a PDB engineer with a stick, leaving him severely injured.

In September 2014, Siddiqui was widely criticised for his remarks criticising the Muslim pilgrimage, the Hajj, and the Islamic organisation, the Tabligh Jamaat, leading to strong calls for his removal from the cabinet. On 30 September, he was sacked from his ministerial post in the cabinet.

On 17 October 2018, the Anti-Corruption Commission (ACC) accused Siddiqui for misusing power and damaging government property under the Penal Code and section 5(2) of the Anti-Corruption Commission Act 1947. On 20 June 2019, a Bogura court denied his bail and ordered him to be jailed. In July 2020, the Supreme Court upheld a High Court order that stayed for six months the trial proceedings.

References

Living people
1943 births
People from Tangail District
Awami League politicians
Posts, Telecommunications and Information Technology ministers
Textiles and Jute ministers of Bangladesh
7th Jatiya Sangsad members
9th Jatiya Sangsad members
Date of birth missing (living people)